Salicornia fruticosa, synonym Sarcocornia fruticosa, is a species of glasswort in the family Amaranthaceae (pigweeds). It is native to southern Europe, north Africa, Western Asia and Yemen. It is a halophyte, a plant that can grow in saline conditions.

References

fruticosa
Halophytes
Flora of Southwestern Europe
Flora of Southeastern Europe
Flora of North Africa
Flora of Western Asia
Flora of Yemen